is a train station on the Tenryū Hamanako Line in Kakegawa, Shizuoka Prefecture, Japan. It is 6 kilometers from the terminus of the line at Kakegawa Station.

Station History
Hosoya Station was established on May 10, 1956, as a passenger station on the Japan National Railway Futamata Line. After the privatization of JNR on March 15, 1987, the station came under the control of the Tenryū Hamanako Line.

Lines
Tenryū Hamanako Railroad
Tenryū Hamanako Line

Layout
Hosoya Station is an unmanned station with a single elevated side platform, and a small wooden waiting room.

Adjacent stations

|-
!colspan=5|Tenryū Hamanako Railroad

External links
  Tenryū Hamanako Railroad Station information
	

Railway stations in Shizuoka Prefecture
Railway stations in Japan opened in 1956
Stations of Tenryū Hamanako Railroad